Oksywie is a district of the city of Gdynia, Pomeranian Voivodeship, northern Poland. Formerly a separate settlement, it is older than Gdynia by several centuries.

Oksywie is notable as the location of the Polish Naval Academy and one of the bases of the Polish Navy. It was also the namesake of ORP Oksywie.

Etymology
Both the Polish and then German name of the town, as well as various other names for it used in the past (among them Oxsiua, Oxive, Okciua, Oxue, Oxivia, Oxiuia, Oxiwia, Oxiew and Oxivija) stem from a Scandinavian word oxihoved meaning oxen head.

History

In the pre-historic times the Oksywie Heights, overlooking the Bay of Gdańsk, was settled by the members of the Oksywie culture, named after the burial places located just outside Oksywie. With time the area was settled by Slavs and became part of Pomerania. It became part of the emerging Polish state under its first historic ruler Mieszko I in the 10th century. Christianised relatively early, the settlement housed the first Catholic shrine erected in 1224 by Świętopełk I, Duke of Pomerania. Throughout the ages, the settlement shared much of its history with the surrounding region and with the nearby city of Gdańsk, which developed into a regional capital. Oksywie was a possession of the Premonstratensian Monastery in Żukowo, administratively located in the Puck County in the Pomeranian Voivodeship of the Kingdom of Poland.

After the World War I, when Poland regained the area after 123 years of partitions, Oksywie became the first base of the Polish Navy. It served this role until the outbreak of World War II. During the German invasion of Poland of 1939, the area was the battlefield of the 9 days long battle of Kępa Oksywska, in which the Polish forces under Col. Stanisław Dąbek defended the area between September 10 and September 19. During the last stages of the war, the area yet again became a battlefield, this time between March 28 and April 5, 1945, when the area of the Oksywie Heights became the last stand of the surrounded German forces in Pomerania.

Sights
Landmarks of Oksywie include the medieval Saint Michael Archangel church, which is the oldest church of Gdynia, and the Polish Navy Cemetery.

References

Districts of Gdynia
Populated coastal places in Poland